Li Hong (652 – 25 May 675), formally Emperor Xiaojing (孝敬皇帝, literally, "the filial and respectful emperor") with the temple name of Yizong (義宗), was a crown prince (not emperor, despite his formal title) of the Chinese Tang Dynasty. He was the fifth son of Emperor Gaozong and the oldest son of his second wife Empress Wu (later known as Wu Zetian), and he was made the crown prince in 656. As he grew older, he often came in conflict with his ambitious and powerful mother Empress Wu, and it is commonly believed by traditional historians that she poisoned him to death in 675. His father Emperor Gaozong, then still reigning, posthumously honored him with an imperial title.

Background
Li Hong's mother Consort Wu had been a concubine of Emperor Taizong. After Emperor Taizong's death in 649, she, like all of his surviving concubines who did not bear children, was sent to Ganye Temple (感業寺) to be a Buddhist nun. However, in 650 or 651, when Emperor Taizong's son and successor Emperor Gaozong visited Ganye Temple to offer incense, he saw her and remembered how he had been impressed by her beauty, and both of them wept. Emperor Gaozong's wife Empress Wang, who was sonless and had felt threatened by his favorite concubine Consort Xiao, who had given birth to a son (Li Sujie), found out about the situation, and decided to welcome Consort Wu back to the palace to be a concubine of Emperor Gaozong to divert his favors from Consort Xiao. Consort Wu soon became his favorite (so much so that Empress Wang and Consort Xiao, threatened by her, soon became allies against her), and she gave birth to Li Hong in 652. Li Hong was Emperor Gaozong's fifth son and her first son. In 653, he was made the Prince of Dai.

In 655, Consort Wu falsely accused Empress Wang and her mother Lady Liu of using witchcraft and of murdering her daughter. Emperor Gaozong deposed both Empress Wang and Consort Xiao and replaced Empress Wang with Consort Wu. Empress Wang and Consort Xiao were soon executed on Empress Wu's orders. Prior to this, in 652, Emperor Gaozong's oldest son (by his lowly-born concubine Consort Liu), Li Zhong, had been made the crown prince already, but Empress Wu had her ally, the official Xu Jingzong submit a petition arguing that now that the empress had her own sons, Li Zhong should step aside. Emperor Gaozong agreed, and in spring 656, Emperor Gaozong demoted Li Zhong to the title of Prince of Liang and made Li Hong the crown prince instead.

As crown prince
As Li Hong grew in age, he developed a reputation for studiousness and kindness. He had, at one point, studied the Zuo Zhuan under the official Guo Yu (郭瑜), and when they reached the records dealing with how King Mu of Chu had killed his father King Cheng, Li Hong became distressed even reading about the incident, and after Guo pointed out that studying history was important so that history would not be repeated, he was still distressed, and so Guo advised him to study the Classic of Rites instead.

In 661, formally by his orders, Xu Jingzong, Xu Yushi, Shangguan Yi, and Yang Sijian (楊思儉) compiled a collection of particularly beautiful writing into a 500-volume work entitled the Yaoshan Yucai (瑤山玉彩, literally "the Colors of Jade from Mount Yao") and presented it to Emperor Gaozong. Li Hong, as well as those officials, were rewarded with silk.

Around the new year 669, after Tang forces commanded by Li Ji had conquered Goguryeo in 668, Li Hong, noting the harshness of Emperor Gaozong's prior edict that conscripted soldiers who deserted would be beheaded and their wives and children forced into servitude, submitted a petition, in which he pointed out that at times the alleged deserters were in fact innocent—that they could have been ill, captured by Goguryeo forces without anyone realizing it, drowned while sailing on the way to the Goguryeo front, or been stuck behind Goguryeo lines. He requested that the penalty as to the alleged deserters' families be removed, and Emperor Gaozong agreed.

In 671, perhaps due to Empress Wu's distaste for the capital Chang'an (due to her recurring dreams of Empress Wang and Consort Xiao taking vengeance on her), Emperor Gaozong and Empress Wu left Chang'an and took up residence at the eastern capital Luoyang, rarely returning to Chang'an from that point on. Li Hong was left in charge at Chang'an, although it was said that he was often ill, and the decisions were largely made by his staff members Dai Zhide, Zhang Wenguan, and Xiao Dezhao (蕭德昭). However, several acts of kindness were attributed to Li Hong. Most notably, during a major famine in Guanzhong (the capital region), Li Hong, realizing that even his own guards were eating acorns and tree barks, distributed rice from the imperial storage, and distributing public lands at Tong Prefecture (同州, roughly modern Weinan, Shaanxi) to the poor.

Death and aftermaths
One of Li Hong's kind acts, however, caused a deterioration of his relationship with his mother Empress Wu. Consort Xiao's daughters Princess Yiyang and Gao'an had, because of their mother, been put under house arrest inside the palace, so much so that they were not yet married even though they were over 39 years in age. Once, when Li Hong met them by chance, he took pity on them, and requested the Emperor Gaozong allow them to marry, and Emperor Gaozong agreed. In anger, Empress Wu immediately married them to two palace guards named Quan Yi (權毅) and Wang Xu (王勗), and she became displeased at Li Hong. Empress Wu acted like a ruthless ruler during her husband's reign, having those who opposed her assassinated or executed at will. Empress Wu became so powerful that Li Hong and next, his brother Li Xian, began to be concerned. The relationship between mother and son further deteriorated over Li Hong's repeated suggestions to Empress Wu that she is not so controlling of the governmental affairs and asked her to hand over control of the government to him.

At a later point, by order of Empress Wu Li Hong was no longer in command at Chang'an, and he went to Luoyang to join his parents. There, he married his wife Crown Princess Pei, the daughter of the general Pei Judao.

In 675, Li Hong, while visiting Hebi Palace (合璧宮), near Luoyang, with his parents, died suddenly. Most traditional historians believed that Empress Wu poisoned him to death. Emperor Gaozong was greatly saddened by his son's death, and he, in an unprecedented move, posthumously honored Li Hong the title of Emperor Xiaojing, and ordered that he be buried with honors due an emperor. (However, when an imperial tomb was to be built for Li Hong, it was said that the conscripted laborers were so displeased at the labor that they simply threw the construction material they had and deserted.)

Li Hong was sonless. For a while, his nephew Li Longji (the later Emperor Xuanzong), the son of his brother Li Dan (the later Emperor Ruizong), was posthumously adopted into his line. During the reign of his brother Emperor Zhongzong, he was worshipped at the imperial temple (with the temple name of Yizong), and his wife Crown Princess Pei was posthumously honored Empress Ai and worshipped there as well. However, after Emperor Zhongzong's death and succession by Emperor Ruizong, the chancellors Yao Yuanzhi and Song Jing pointed out that it was inappropriate for Li Hong, who did not actually take the throne, to be worshipped with emperors, and so he was given a separate temple at Luoyang and no longer referred to by the temple name of Yizong.

Ancestry

Notes and references

 Old Book of Tang, vol. 86.
 New Book of Tang, vol. 81.
 Zizhi Tongjian, vols. 200, 201, 202

Tang dynasty imperial princes
652 births
675 deaths
Wu Zetian
Heirs apparent who never acceded
People from Xi'an